Angela Margaret Flanders (4 December 1927 – 27 April 2016) was a British perfumer.

Flanders was born on 4 December 1927 in Buxton, Derbyshire.

In 1958, she married Michael Evans. They had a daughter, Kate. The marriage was later dissolved.

In 1985, Flanders opened her first shop, in Columbia Road Flower Market in Bethnal Green.

In 2012, her scent, Precious One, created for her daughter, won Best New Independent Fragrance at the FiFi Awards.

She died on 27 April 2016.

Selected publications
Aromatics (Mitchell Beazley, 1995)

References

1927 births
2016 deaths
Perfumers
People from Buxton